This is a list of countries by coconut production from the years 2016 to 2020, based on data from the Food and Agriculture Organization Corporate Statistical Database. The estimated total world production for coconuts in 2020 was 61,520,382 metric tonnes, down 1.0% from 62,159,626 tonnes in 2019. Dependent territories are shown in italics.

The Philippines, Indonesia and India produce around 70% of the world's total copra, with the Philippines and Indonesia also being the world's main coconut oil exporters.

Coconut production by country

Notes

References 

Coconut
Coconuts
Coconuts